Camilla Cedercreutz (born 31 January 1993) is a Finnish sailor. She and Noora Ruskola placed 17th in the 49erFX event at the 2016 Summer Olympics.

References

1993 births
Living people
Finnish female sailors (sport)
Olympic sailors of Finland
Sailors at the 2016 Summer Olympics – 49er FX